The President Moon Jae-in's resignation movement is a civic resistance movement calling for the resignation of Moon Jae-in, the 19th President of the Republic of Korea. It started to take place in earnest by the organizers who led the protest against the impeachment of President Park Geun-hye. A wave of anti-government protests swept South Korea throughout October 2019, when millions of demonstrators marched in downtown Seoul in street protests and 2-week long movement against the corruption scandals involving president Moon Jae-in and  former justice minister Cho-Kuk. After a long period of unprecedented demonstrations, the minister resigned and a new justice minister was put into place. Although protests took place in October 2019, more known as the South Korean October Revolution , protests against the refugee crisis occurred in June 2018, the large pro-Japan trade and anti-restrictions street protests between May–August 2019, anti-North Korea riots in February 2018. 1 was suspected killed in clashes in February 2018 but it has not been confirmed.

See also
 2016-2017 South Korean protests

References

Protests in South Korea
2010s in South Korea